"" (English: "Where My Home Is") is the national anthem of the Czech Republic, written by the composer František Škroup and the playwright Josef Kajetán Tyl.

History 
The piece was written as a part of the incidental music to the comedy Fidlovačka aneb Žádný hněv a žádná rvačka (Fidlovačka, or No Anger and No Brawl). It was first performed by Karel Strakatý at the Estates Theatre in Prague on 21 December 1834. The original song consists of two verses (see below). Although J. K. Tyl is said to have considered leaving the song out of the play, not convinced of its quality, it soon became very popular among Czechs and was accepted as an informal anthem of a nation seeking to revive its identity within the Habsburg monarchy.

Soon after Czechoslovakia was formed in 1918, the first verse of the song became the Czech part of the national anthem, followed by the first verse of the Slovak song "Nad Tatrou sa blýska". The songs reflected the two nations' concerns in the 19th century when they were confronted with the already fervent national-ethnic activism of the Germans and the Hungarians, their fellow ethnic groups in the Habsburg Monarchy. Because of the linguistic and ethnic diversity of the First Republic, official translations were made into Hungarian and German as well.

With the split of Czechoslovakia in December 1992, the Czechoslovak anthem was divided as well. While Slovakia extended its anthem by adding a second verse, the Czech Republic's national anthem was adopted unextended, in its single-verse version.

In 1882, Antonín Dvořák used Kde domov můj in his incidental music to the František Ferdinand Šamberk play Josef Kajetán Tyl, Op. 62, B. 125.  The overture is often played separately as a concert work entitled Domov můj (My Home).

Lyrics

Original lyrics (from Fidlovačka, 1834)

National anthem of Czechoslovakia 1918–1992 

The first stanza, along with that of the Slovak song Nad Tatrou sa blýska which is nowadays the national anthem of Slovakia, became from 1918 to 1992 the national anthem of Czechoslovakia.

Current lyrics (adapted version)

The following are the lyrics according to Appendix 6 of Czech Act No. 3/1993 Coll., as adapted by Act No. 154/1998 Coll.

Notes

References

External links 

 Czech Republic: Kde domov můj? – Audio of the national anthem of the Czech Republic, with information and lyrics (archive link)
 State Symbols – Ministry of Foreign Affairs – The Ministry of Foreign Affairs has a page about state symbols that includes a copy of the music of the anthem.
 New (2008) official recordings – female solo, male solo, choir, and orchestral versions.

European anthems
National symbols of the Czech Republic
Czech songs
Czech anthems
1834 songs
National anthems
National anthem compositions in E major